Patrick Sibley Jan Derham  (born 23 August 1959) is a history teacher who served as Headmaster of Westminster School from 2014 to 2020.

Education 
Derham was educated aboard the permanently moored Arethusa II and Pangbourne College before gaining a First Class Degree in History (1982) at Pembroke College, Cambridge, specialising in the study of Ireland.

Career
Derham previously served as Headmaster of Solihull School (1996–2001) and Rugby School (2001–2014), when he also served as a school governor of the Lawrence Sheriff School, and is a trustee of Gladstone's Library.

Views 
Derham is known for his strong views on independent schools in the United Kingdom and makes occasional press appearances to argue his case, including inviting those from the other side of the debate to speak at the school. At Westminster, he introduced the PISA tests, introduced Queen's Scholarships for Girls and announced plans to open 6 schools in China from 2020, although these plans drew criticism from many of the students, as the schools will teach the Chinese Communist curriculum, as opposed to an international curriculum normally taught by international schools. Steve Tsang, director of the China Institute at SOAS, University of London, was quoted in the Financial Times as saying: “I think they have no idea what they’re dealing with [...] If you set up a school in China, they will have a party secretary superintending the whole school and the party secretary will be responsible for political education”. The issue was re-opened when The Times published an article, quoting Professor Edward Vickers of Kyushu University, accusing the school (and King's College School who have similar plans) of "helping Chinese teach propaganda". He edited a book, Loyal Dissent - a story of some of those who studied at Westminster.

Awards and honours
Derham was appointed Officer of the Order of the British Empire in the 2018 Birthday Honours for services to education.

Personal life 
Derham met his wife Alison at Cambridge where she was studying English and Drama at Homerton College, Cambridge. They have two adult children. In 2019, he announced that he would retire in 2020.

References 

Alumni of Pembroke College, Cambridge
Living people
Head Masters of Westminster School
1959 births
Officers of the Order of the British Empire